Kehoe House is a historic building in the American city of Savannah, Georgia. It is located in the northwestern civic block of Columbia Square and was built in 1892. It is part of the Savannah Historic District. 

The home was built for Irish immigrant William Kehoe, owner of Kehoe Iron Founder, his second home on the square, after 130 Habersham Street, built in 1885 and now known as the William J. Kehoe House. After both his business and his family expanded, he built this, larger, home diagonally across the square.

Now a 15-room inn, it is one of three "Historic Inns of Savannah," the other two being The Gastonian, at 220 East Gaston Street, and the Eliza Thompson House Bed and Breakfast, at 5 West Jones Street.

The inn is owned by Savannah's HLC Hotels, Inc., which also owns the city's Olde Harbour Inn, the Eliza Thompson House, the East Bay Inn and The Gastonian.

References

External links

Houses completed in 1892
Houses in Savannah, Georgia
Columbia Square (Savannah) buildings
Savannah Historic District